Andrés Ortiz-Osés (1943 – 18 June 2021) was a Spanish philosopher.  He was the founder of symbolic hermeneutics, a philosophical trend that gave a symbolic twist to north European hermeneutics.

He was born in Tardienta, studied theology in Comillas and Rome, and then moved to The Institute of Philosophy in Innsbruck where he earned a Ph.D. in hermeneutics.

At Innsbruck he attended the lessons of Gadamer and Coreth. He was a member of the Eranos group, inspired by C.G. Jung. Other members of Eranos have included Joseph Campbell, Karl Kerenyi, Mircea Eliade, Erich Neumann, Gilbert Durand, and James Hillman.

He was largely responsible for introducing Jungian theories into the Spanish and Latin American intellectual scene. He became a professor of hermeneutics at the University of Deusto in Bilbao.  He wrote more than thirty books. He died in Zaragoza on 18 June 2021 at the age of 78.

Cfr. Andrés Ortiz-Osés, The Sense of the World (David Sumares, trans.). The Davies Group, Colorado, 2008

Related authors
Gianni Vattimo
Raimon Panikkar
Paul Ricoeur
Ernest Bornemann
Jorge Oteiza

Select bibliography
His whole body of work can be divided into four categories:

1. Hermeneutical treatises.

Antropología Hermenéutica, Editorial Ricardo Aguilera, 1973.
Mundo, hombre y lenguaje crítico, Sígueme. 1976.
Comunicación y experiencia interhumana, Descleé. 1977. 
La nueva Filosofía hermenéutica, Anthropos, 1986. 

2. Symbolic and Mythological studies, especially interpretations of the Basque mythology.

El matriarcalismo vasco, Universidad de Deusto, 1980. 
El inconsciente colectivo vasco, Txertoa, 1982. 
Antropología simbólica vasca, Anthropos, 1985. 
La identidad cultural aragonesa, Centro de Estudios Bajoaragoneses, 1992.
La Diosa Madre, Trotta. 1996.
Las claves simbólicas de nuestra cultura, Anthropos, 1992. 
Cuestiones fronterizas, Anthropos, 1999.

3. Metaphysics of the sense of life.

Metafísica del sentido, Universidad de Deusto, 1989. 
Cuestiones fronterizas, Anthropos, 1999. 
La razón afectiva, 2000. 
Amor y Sentido, 2003. 

4. Aphorisms.

Co-Razón, MRA, 1996. 
Experiencia / Existencia, March Editor, 2006. 
Filosofía de la experiencia, Instituto de Estudios Altoaragoneses, 2006.

References  

1943 births
2021 deaths
Hermeneutists
Spanish philosophers
Aphorists
Comillas Pontifical University alumni
Pontifical Gregorian University alumni
University of Innsbruck alumni
Academic staff of the University of Deusto
People from Monegros